"If You Go Down (I'm Goin' Down Too)" is a song recorded by American country music artist Kelsea Ballerini. It was released to country music radio on December 5, 2022, as the second single from Ballerini's fourth studio album, Subject to Change. It was written by Ballerini, Shane McAnally and Julian Bunetta, with the latter two also producing the track. Lyrically, the song is about a supportive female friendship, with Ballerini noting that she will stick through her friend whatever trouble she ends up getting into.

Content
The song was the final one written for Subject to Change, as the majority of the album had already been cut. Ballerini and her collaborators decided to book one final writing day in case they had anything left in the tank and, when reviewing the topics covered by the songs on the album, realized there wasn't one that honored her friendships. Of this, Ballerini explained, "friends was a huge theme on my last record - the two lyrics that popped up the most on that Kelsea record were 'home' and 'friends, and so it was like I was doing a disservice to a pillar in my life to not have a song that carried that through." Speaking to Billboard, Ballerini stated that the song was written to evoke thoughts of the 1991 film Thelma & Louise and The Chicks' "Goodbye Earl", noting that “these really beautiful best-friend stories that had a tinge of murder attached” helped to inspire the song. Buetta, in turn, composed an upbeat, cheery melody and instrumentation on his guitarlele to contrast with the darkly comedic lyrics. Similarly, Ballerini took roughly two hours to record her vocals and was careful to ensure that the song's tongue-and-cheek message was conveyed effectively.

Sonically the song reflects the country pop and neotraditional country styles, with Ballerini explaining that “we really wanted to lean into a very ’90s country feel, and so we brought in fiddle for the song, which I think to me makes it. That’s also why there’s a Chicks reference to it, which everyone picks up on, which was absolutely intentional. I didn’t want to make it sound like anything else on the record. I wanted it to be its own moment.”"

In interviews, Ballerini discussed the song's significance in her personal life at the time, citing that her female friends were vital while she was going through her divorce from Morgan Evans, stating “sometimes you put out a single because you think that it's the most radio-friendly, and sometimes you put out a single because it's actually reflective of where you're at in your life," she said. "And then sometimes, both things can be true.”

Concept video
The song's concept video premiered on September 16, 2022 and features Ballerini in a pastel-colored room engaging in various activities such as applying make-up, reading a book, calling a friend, cleaning and drinking wine, seemingly unfazed as the weather outside slowly worsens, ending with hurricanes, explosions and thunder and lightning.

Live performances
Ballerini performed an acoustic version of the song live on her episode of CMT Storytellers, which aired on February 16, 2023. Ballerini included the song as part of the setlist of her 2022–2023 Heartfirst Tour.

Personnel
Julian Bunetta – producer, mandolin, dobro, guitar
Kelsea Ballerini – vocals
Jenee Fleenor – fiddle
Evan Hutchings – drums
Shane McAnally – producer
Craig Young – bass

Charts

References

2022 singles
2022 songs
Kelsea Ballerini songs
American country music songs
Black River Entertainment singles
Songs written by Kelsea Ballerini
Songs written by Shane McAnally
Song recordings produced by Shane McAnally